Fort Fraser was a United States Army fortification constructed in November 1837 between the modern cities of Lakeland and Bartow in Polk County, Florida. The fort's name was inspired by Upton S. Fraser, a captain in the U.S. Army who was killed by Seminole Indians in the March to Fort King on December 28, 1835. Colonel Zachary Taylor, who later became the president of the United States, served at Fort Fraser as commander of two companies of the 1st U.S. Infantry. The fort was abandoned by the Army in May 1838, only to be informally used later as a shelter during the American Civil War and Third Seminole War.

References 

Government buildings completed in 1837
Infrastructure completed in 1837
Fraser
Buildings and structures in Polk County, Florida
Pre-statehood history of Florida
1837 establishments in Florida Territory